Anzhero-Sudzhensk is a town in the Kuznetsk Basin in Kemerovo Oblast, Russia, located to the north of the oblast's administrative center of Kemerovo and to the east of the Tom River, on the route of the Trans-Siberian Railway. Population:

History
The town was formed by merging the settlements of Anzherka and Sudzhenka.

Administrative and municipal status
Within the framework of administrative divisions, it is, together with the urban-type settlement of Rudnichny and seven rural localities, incorporated as Anzhero-Sudzhensk Town Under Oblast Jurisdiction—an administrative unit with the status equal to that of the districts. As a municipal division, Anzhero-Sudzhensk Town Under Oblast Jurisdiction is incorporated as Anzhero-Sudzhensky Urban Okrug.

References

Notes

Sources

External links
Official website of Anzhero-Sudzhensk 
Directory of organizations in Anzhero-Sudzhensk 

1897 establishments in the Russian Empire
Cities and towns in Kemerovo Oblast
Monotowns in Russia
Populated places established in 1897